John William Narváez Arroyo (born 12 June 1991) is an Ecuadorian footballer who plays for Carlos A. Mannucci
as a defender.

Career
Born in Esmeraldas, Narváez began playing football with Deportivo Cuenca. He had a brief playthrough with El Nacional in 2012. He joined Ecuadorian Serie A side Club Sport Emelec in 2013, and featured regularly as the club won the 2013 tournament.

The defender played for Emelec in the 2014 Copa Libertadores.

On 13 July 2016, it was confirmed that Narváez would be joining LDU Quito.

International career
Narváez is a Youth product of Deportivo Cuenca. He was part of the Ecuadorian squad which played at the 2011 South American U-20 Championship, qualifying 4th for the 2011 FIFA U-20 World Cup. The Squad went on to reach the Round of 16, being defeated by France.

Narváez was called up for the 2014 FIFA World Cup preliminary squad. He didn't make the cut to the final 23. He was once again called up for the 2015 Copa América making the cut for the final 23 this time around. He made his debut on June 6, 2015 against Panama coming in as a sub for Jefferson Montero.

References

External links
John Narváez profile at Federación Ecuatoriana de Fútbol 

1991 births
Living people
Ecuadorian footballers
Ecuadorian expatriate footballers
Ecuadorian Serie A players
Peruvian Primera División players
C.D. Cuenca footballers
C.S. Emelec footballers
C.D. El Nacional footballers
L.D.U. Quito footballers
FBC Melgar footballers
C.S.D. Macará footballers
Ecuador international footballers
2015 Copa América players
People from Esmeraldas Province
Association football defenders
Ecuadorian expatriate sportspeople in Peru
Expatriate footballers in Peru